Anneville-sur-Mer (literally Anneville on Sea) is a former commune in the Manche department in the Normandy region in northwestern France. On 1 January 2019, it was merged into the commune Gouville-sur-Mer.

Population

See also
Communes of the Manche department

References

Former communes of Manche